Kilmany is a small farming town in eastern Victoria, Australia. Kilmany is known for farming and agriculture. Melbourne is located 175 km west of Kilmany, and Sale is located 14 km east of Kilmany.

Nambrok South Post Office opened on 13 January 1913, was renamed Kilmany on 12 May 1913 and closed in 1973.

Kilmany Centenary
On 12 March 2011 Kilmany celebrated 100 years of settlement by having a centenary at the Kilmany hall. Around 600 people turned up. There was a group photo, cake, legend cricket match, many displays (tractors, old cars, pictures and videos, etc.) and more. It was a great day for the locals.

References

External links
 https://web.archive.org/web/20130522121922/http://kilmany.com.au/
 Kilmany Centenary Facebook Page (Search "Kilmany Closer Settlement Centenary 2011")

Towns in Victoria (Australia)
Shire of Wellington